Ural is a rural locality (a village) in Yangiskainsky Selsoviet, Gafuriysky District, Bashkortostan, Russia. The population was 38 as of 2010. There is 1 street.

Geography 
Ural is located 27 km southwest of Krasnousolsky (the district's administrative centre) by road. Yangiskain is the nearest rural locality.

References 

Rural localities in Gafuriysky District